Lady Pamela Carmen Louise Hicks (née Mountbatten; born 19 April 1929) is a British aristocrat and relative of the British royal family. She is the younger daughter of Louis Mountbatten, 1st Earl Mountbatten of Burma (formerly Prince Louis of Battenberg) and  Edwina Mountbatten, Countess Mountbatten of Burma. Through her father, Lady Pamela is a first cousin of the late Prince Philip, Duke of Edinburgh, and a grandniece of the last Empress of Russia, Alexandra Feodorovna. She served as a bridesmaid and later as a lady-in-waiting to Queen Elizabeth II.

Early life and family 
Lady Pamela was born on 19 April 1929 in Barcelona, Spain to Edwina Ashley and Louis Mountbatten, 1st Earl Mountbatten of Burma. She is the second of two children, as a younger sister of Patricia Knatchbull, 2nd Countess Mountbatten of Burma. A member of the Mountbatten family by birth, she descended from the Battenberg family, a morganatic cadet branch of the House of Hesse-Darmstadt. At the request of George V, her grandparents Prince Louis of Battenberg and Princess Victoria of Hesse and by Rhine relinquished their German princely titles in 1917 in exchange for titles in the British peerage due to anti-German sentiment in Britain. Her father, who was also born a prince of Battenberg, was later created  Earl Mountbatten of Burma. Through her father, she is a great-great granddaughter of Queen Victoria and Prince Albert of Saxe-Coburg and Gotha, and as of 2023, their oldest surviving descendant. Her mother, Edwina, was the daughter of Wilfrid Ashley, 1st Baron Mount Temple. Through her mother, Lady Pamela is also a great-granddaughter of Sir Ernest Cassel and a great-great granddaughter of Anthony Ashley-Cooper, 7th Earl of Shaftesbury. Through her father, she is a first cousin of Prince Philip, Duke of Edinburgh.

She attended Hewitt School in New York City.

In 1947, Lady Pamela accompanied her parents to India remaining with them throughout her father's term as Viceroy of pre-Independence India and then Governor-General of post-Partition India through 1948, living with them in Government House, New Delhi and the summer Viceregal Lodge in Simla.

Official duties 

In November 1947, Lady Pamela acted as a bridesmaid to then-Princess Elizabeth at her 1947 wedding to Prince Philip, Duke of Edinburgh. As lady-in-waiting to Princess Elizabeth she was with her and the Duke of Edinburgh in Kenya when George VI died on 6 February 1952. In late 1953 and early 1954, she accompanied the Queen as lady-in-waiting on the royal tour to Jamaica, Panama, Fiji, Tonga, New Zealand, Australia, Ceylon, Aden, Libya, Malta and Gibraltar.

Lady Pamela Mountbatten was the Corps Commandant of the Girls' Nautical Training Corps from around 1952 to around 1959.

Marriage and children

Lady Pamela is the widow of interior decorator and designer David Nightingale Hicks (25 March 1929 – 29 March 1998), son of stockbroker Herbert Hicks and Iris Elsie Platten. They were married on 13 January 1960 at Romsey Abbey in Hampshire. The bridesmaids were Princess Anne, Princess Clarissa of Hesse (daughter of her cousin Sophie), Victoria Marten (god-daughter of the bride), the Hon. Joanna Knatchbull and the Hon. Amanda Knatchbull (daughters of the bride's sister Patricia). Upon returning from honeymoon in the West Indies and New York, Lady Pamela learnt of the death of her mother in February 1960.

Together, the couple had three children:

Edwina Victoria Louise Hicks (born 24 December 1961), married the actor Jeremy Brudenell.
Ashley Louis David Hicks (born 18 July 1963)
India Amanda Caroline Hicks (born 5 September 1967)

David Nightingale Hicks died on 29 March 1998, aged 69, from lung cancer.

Later life
Lady Pamela Hicks has been a Director of H Securities Unlimited, a fund management and brokerage firm, since 1991. She is a former director of Cottesmore Farms. In 2002, she sold her mother's tiara at Sotheby's.

In 2007, Lady Pamela published her memoirs of her days in New Delhi and Simla, when India was partitioned into India and Pakistan and the Union Jack came down. She wrote in India Remembered: A Personal Account of the Mountbattens During the Transfer of Power that, while her mother, Countess Mountbatten of Burma, and Jawaharlal Nehru, the future Prime Minister of India, were deeply in love, "the relationship remained platonic". In 2012, she published the second volume of her memoirs titled Daughter of Empire: Life as a Mountbatten, chronicling her childhood, her time in India, and  her time as lady-in-waiting to the Queen.

After the death of her cousin, Prince Philip, Duke of Edinburgh in 2021, she is the last surviving great-grandchild of Princess Alice of the United Kingdom, and following the death of Queen Elizabeth II in September 2022, she became the oldest living descendant of Queen Victoria. With her daughter, India Hicks, she attended the queen's state funeral on 19 September 2022.

In film and television
In 2016, she was portrayed in the first season of The Crown. She is portrayed by Lily Travers in the 2017 film Viceroy's House.

Published and upcoming works

References 

1929 births
Living people
20th-century English women
20th-century English people
21st-century English memoirists
21st-century English women writers
English people of German-Jewish descent
Daughters of British earls
British ladies-in-waiting
Hewitt School alumni
Pamela
People from Barcelona